Iván Alejandro Moreira Barros (born 8 December 1956) is a Chilean politician who currently serves as Senator of the Republic of Chile. An opponent of same-sex marriage, he accused the Chilean government of "bowing to the agenda of the left" in pushing the bill through the parliament in 2021, and accused Sebastián Piñera of abandoning his constituency and the "commitments we had with the world of values."

References

External links
 

1956 births
Living people
Chilean Christians
Chilean people
Chilean people of Galician descent
National Party (Chile, 1966) politicians
Independent Democratic Union politicians
20th-century Chilean politicians
21st-century Chilean politicians
Chilean anti-communists
Senators of the LV Legislative Period of the National Congress of Chile
Senators of the LVI Legislative Period of the National Congress of Chile